This article compares SysML tools. SysML tools are software applications which support some functions of the Systems Modeling Language.

General

Features

References 

 
Technical communication
Software comparisons
Diagramming software
Computing-related lists